The Orlea is a right tributary of the river Tismana in Romania. It flows into the Tismana in Câlcești.

References

Rivers of Romania
Rivers of Gorj County